The 2020 California Proposition 31 was officially titled "State Budget. State and Local Government. Initiative Constitutional Amendment and Statute." and was a California ballot measure that appeared on the ballot in the November 2012 California elections. The initiative would have established a two-year state budget, allowed the Governor to make budget cuts in fiscal emergencies, would have prevented the state Legislature from spending more than $25 million without creating spending cuts or other budget offsets, and would have allowed local governments the ability to transfer certain amounts of property taxes among themselves instead of the state. Although the law was supported by the California Republican Party multiple conservative groups came out against proposition 31 including members of the tea party movement who viewed the law as a way to undermine property rights.

Analysis 
If Proposition 31 had passed it was estimated that the state government would have suffered a loss of $200 million as these funds would have been transferred to local governments.

Editorial endorsements

References 

2012 California ballot propositions
Failed amendments to the Constitution of California
Initiatives in the United States